Asile's World is the second album by Elisa released in 2000. The album went double Platinum in Italy with 250.000 copies sold. Its repackage contains "Luce (tramonti a nord est)" with which Elisa won the 1st place at the famous Sanremo Festival in 2001.

Track listing 

Re-issue

Personnel 

 Marc Abraham – acoustic bass
 Howie B – producer
 Antonio Baglio – mastering
 Enrico Colombo – producer, remixing
 Paul Cook – programming
 Elisa – piano, keyboards, programming, vocals, producer
 Andrea Fontana – drums
 Gaudi – theremin, moog
 Michael Gordon – string arrangements
 Paolo Gozzetti – mixing
 Billy Konkel – assistant engineer, mixing assistant
 Leo Z – percussion, piano, electric bass, electric guitar, harp, keyboards, programming, producer, engineer, computers, sampling, djembe, shaker, mixing
 Aidan Love – programming
 Luca Malaguti – programming, engineer, mixing, pre-mastering
 Mauro Malavasi – production supervisor
 Trevor Morais – drums
 Will O'Donovan – engineer, mixing
 Fabio Recupero – mixing assistant
 Benny Rietveld – bass
 Devon Rietveld – bass, engineer, mixing
 Corrado Rustici – guitar, arranger, keyboards, programming, producer, string arrangements
 Soul Boy – backing vocals
 Caterina Caselli Sugar – project support
 Chris Taylor – guitar
 Rudy Trevisi – percussion
 Michael Urbano – drums
 Fred Ventura – producer, remixing

References 

2000 albums
Elisa (Italian singer) albums
Trip hop albums by Italian artists